James Donald Walsh (born August 9, 1946) is an American diplomat and foreign service officer.

Walsh served as the United States Ambassador to Argentina from his appointment on June 14, 2000, until he left the post on May 21, 2003.

Walsh was born on August 9, 1946 in Scranton, Pennsylvania, where he was also raised. He graduated from Scranton Preparatory School, received his bachelor's degree from the University of Scranton, and a master's degree from the Maxwell School of Citizenship and Public Affairs at Syracuse University.

References

1946 births
Living people
Ambassadors of the United States to Argentina
University of Scranton alumni
Maxwell School of Citizenship and Public Affairs alumni
21st-century American diplomats